Bettingerode is a village that forms a municipal district of Bad Harzburg in the district of Goslar in Lower Saxony. As of 2020, Bettingerode had a population of 402.

Geography 
The village is penetrated by the Schamlah, a tributary of the Ecker.

Infrastructure 
District roads connect Bettingerode to Harlingerode/Radau Estate to the west, Lochtum to the north, Eckertal to the east, and Westerode to the south. The A 369 has an exit one kilometer west of Bettingerode.

History

Etymology 
The name Bettingerode means "Clearing of the people of Bado". The name of the founder is based on the Germanic root *badwō "battle, fight", and cognates with Old English beadu and Old Norse bǫð. The -ingerode prefix is a common indicator for clearing between the 9th and 11th century in Eastphalia and is a usual ending for villages in this region (Göttingerode, Harlingerode, etc.).

Bettingerode was first mentioned in 1013 as Redingaroth, assumingly a misspelling of Bedingaroth. Further mentions are:

1018: Beddinge
1129: Botingeroth
1174-1195: Bettingeroth
1265: Bettingerod
13th/14th century: Bettingerode, Bedtingerode, Bedtingerode, Bettyngerode

Timeline 
The oldest building in Bettingerode as well as in Bad Harzburg is the town church that was constructed around 1200. Between 15th and 16th century, the villages Bintingerode/Halbertingerode (before 1506) and Kulingerode (before 1468) were abandoned. Bettingerode fell victim to the flames around 1600.

After World War II, the population of the town increased dramatically owing to Flight and expulsion of Germans from 1944 to 1950, peaking at almost 1000 inhabitants around 1950. As a consequence, the shortern part of Bettingerode ("Silesian Ring") was constructed in order to provide more living space. Bettingerode was incorporated into Bad Harzburg on July 1, 1972, along with the communities Bündheim-Schlewecke, Harlingerode, and Westerode.

Images

References 

Goslar (district)
Bad Harzburg